The Pawn (French: Le Pion) is a 1978 French comedy film directed by  Christian Gion starring Henri Guybet and Claude Jade.

Plot
Bertrand Barabi (Henri Guybet) is a French teacher and deputy supervisor in a school in province. He attended the literary circles of his city and he is despised by his students as the teachers of the institution. Bertrand Barabi lives for the sake of miss Thuillier, professor of French. Dominique Benech (Claude Jade), his lonely neighbor, piano teacher and mother of one of his pupils, who has tender feelings for him, asks him to tutor her son Michel (Mathieu Vermesh). Excited after reading a text by Bertrand, Dominique encourages him to write the novel "Le Pion" (The Pawn). Bertrand continues writing his novel he soon sends to a Parisian publisher. The book is acclaimed. With his pseudonym, Bertrand remains anonymous, but journalists are quick to reveal the identity of the "Prix Goncourt". However, success does not turn the head of Bertrand. And with the help of his students he even ridicules those who wronged him, before rejoining the discrete and tender Dominique who awaits.

Cast 
 Henri Guybet : Bertrand Barabi, dit Bergerac
 Claude Jade : Dominique Benech
 Maureen Kerwin : Mademoiselle Thuillier
 Claude Piéplu : Le censeur 
 Michel Galabru : L'inspecteur d'académie
 Claude Dauphin : Albert Carraud
 Bernard Musson : Boussignac, Director of school 
 Roland Giraud : The Minister
 Mathieu Vermesh : Michel Benech
 Roger Perinoz
 Raymond Colom
 François Guétary
 Dominique Vallée
 Denise Glaser

References

External links
 

Films about education
Films about educators
1978 comedy films
French comedy films
Films shot in Paris
1978 films
1970s French-language films
1970s French films